Dr Erol Kaymak is a Turkish Cypriot academic who in 2004 from 2007 was the Chair of the Department of International Relations at Eastern Mediterranean University in north Cyprus.

Early career
Kaymak received his BA in Political Science at State University of New York at Buffalo in 1990. He completed a master's degree in Political Science at Texas Tech University in 1994, and in 1999 completed his PhD in Political Science at Texas Tech University in Political Science.

Recent activities
Erol Kaymak is currently interested in the study of international phenomena from the vantage point of constructivism, a sociological view of international relations, with the intent of contributing to an understanding of the relationship between ethnic conflict, sovereignty, and the international system. To this end, Dr Kaymak has been researching the Cyprus dispute as a case study of Europeanization processes. Kaymak participated at the technical level negotiations of the Annan Plan for a comprehensive settlement to the Cyprus problem. He is a founding member of the Cyprus Academic Forum (CAF), which is actively working to enhance dialogue among academics on both sides of the island of Cyprus.

Literary career
Dr Kaymak has published works on the Cyprus dispute and other issues of problematic political integration in journals including Nationalism and Ethnic Politics, and Mediterranean Politics. Most recently he authored the northern Cyprus section of the CIVICUS Civil Society Index report for Cyprus that provides a comprehensive analysis of the civil society's structure, environment, values, and impact.

Recent publications
Kaymak, E., Lacher, H. "Transforming Identities:Beyond the Politics of Non-Settlement in North Cyprus", Mediterranean Politics, vol. 10, no. 2, 2005.
Mayer, L., Kaymak, E. "Populism and the Triumph of the Politics of Identity: The Transformation of the Canadian Party System", Nationalism and Ethnic Politics, vol. 6, no. 1, pp. 72 – 102,  2000.

References
 Eastern Mediterranean University Researchers List
 Belfast University Conference
 La Trobe University Conference
 Erfurt University Conference
 Cyprus Policy Center

Turkish Cypriot academics
Living people
Türk Maarif Koleji alumni
Year of birth missing (living people)